Lékai is a Hungarian surname. Notable people with this surname include:

 László Lékai (1910–1986), Archbishop of Esztergom and a Cardinal
 Louis  Lekai, O.Cist. (1916-1994), American monk, historian and university professor born in Hungary
 Máté Lékai (born 1988), Hungarian handball player

Hungarian-language surnames